Soyinka is a Yoruba surname and may refer to:
Grace Eniola Soyinka (1908–1983), Nigerian shopkeeper, activist, member of the aristocratic Ransome-Kuti family and mother of Wole Soyinka
Kayode Soyinka (born 1957), Nigerian journalist, publisher, author 
Olaokun Soyinka (born 1958), Nigerian physician and son of Wole Soyinka
Susan Soyinka (born 1945), social historian, researcher, author and wife of Kayode Soyinka (born 1944), younger brother of Wole Soyinka
Wole Soyinka (born 1934), Nigerian playwright, poet and essayist
Yoruba-language surnames
Surnames